The 2015 Mongolian Premier League also known as the Khurkhree National Top League is the 47th edition of the tournament. Two new teams entered the competition, Deren and Soyombiin Barsuud to increase the number of teams to nine. The season started on 16 May 2015 and was ended on 26 September.

Khurkhree National Premier League
The competition is to be known as the Khurkhree National Premier League for sponsorship reasons, after the Mongolian Football Federation signed a MNT 400 million sponsorship deal with Arvain Undes, a Mongolian company that produces the beer, Khurkhree. As well as the new sponsorship deal, matches will also be broadcast on NTV television and online, with the teams competing for a share of a MNT 100 million prize fund.

Clubs

Clubs and locations

League table

Results

First round

Top goalscorers

References

Mongolia Premier League seasons
foo
Mongolia
Mongolia